Daniel Rae Bell (born 9 May 1990) is a New Zealand swimmer. He swam for New Zealand at the 2008 Summer Olympics and 2012 Summer Olympics; his events being the 100 m butterfly & backstroke and the 4x 100 m medley relay.

Bell won the silver medal in the 100 m backstroke at the 2010 Commonwealth Games, and he won three events at the 2008 FINA Youth World Swimming Championships.

References

External links
 
 
 
 
 

Living people
1990 births
New Zealand male butterfly swimmers
Olympic swimmers of New Zealand
Swimmers at the 2010 Commonwealth Games
Commonwealth Games silver medallists for New Zealand
Swimmers at the 2008 Summer Olympics
Swimmers at the 2012 Summer Olympics
Medalists at the FINA World Swimming Championships (25 m)
Commonwealth Games medallists in swimming
20th-century New Zealand people
21st-century New Zealand people
Medallists at the 2010 Commonwealth Games
New Zealand male backstroke swimmers